Kevin Quinn (born January 23, 1958) is a Canadian sportscaster who was formerly the television play-by-play voice of the Edmonton Oilers on Sportsnet. 

Quinn attended the University of Western Ontario and obtained a degree in psychology. He started his career as an anchor for CKVR Television in Barrie, Ontario, also doing play-by-play for an Ontario Hockey League game every week. Quinn was hired by CTV Sportsnet in 1998, and was a co-anchor for SportsCentral. Following Jim Robson's retirement in 1999, Quinn became the backup play-by-play voice of Vancouver Canucks and Calgary Flames games. He was then the primary play-by-play voice of the Oilers from 2001 to 2020. He also did play-by-play at the 2010 Winter Olympics for women's hockey.

References 

1958 births
Calgary Flames announcers
Canadian colour commentators
Canadian television sportscasters
Edmonton Oilers announcers
Living people
National Hockey League broadcasters
People from Winnipeg
University of Western Ontario alumni
Vancouver Canucks announcers